The 1925 Emperor's Cup was a Japanese association football competition. The fifth Emperor's Cup, it was won by Rijo Shukyu-dan.

Overview
It was contested by 6 teams, and Rijo Shukyu-dan won the championship.

Results

Quarterfinals
Mito High School 9–0 Kagoshima Shihan
Mikage Shukyu-dan 6–1 Nagoya Shukyu-dan

Semifinals
Mito High School 0–1 Tokyo Imperial University
Mikage Shukyu-dan 2–3 Rijo Shukyu-dan

Final

Tokyo Imperial University 0–3 Rijo Shukyu-dan
Rijo Shukyu-dan won the championship.

References
 NHK

Emperor's Cup
1925 in Japanese football